Hadley Bay is an Arctic waterway in the Kitikmeot Region, Nunavut, Canada. It is located in western Viscount Melville Sound, by northern Victoria Island.

Geography
The Nanook River flows north into Hadley Bay. The bay has several unnamed islands within it.

History
Its recent history has included mining exploration.

References

Victoria Island (Canada)
Bays of Kitikmeot Region